The common false moray, false moray, grey reef eel, or plain false moray, (Kaupichthys diodontus), is an eel in the family Chlopsidae. It was described by Leonard Peter Schultz in 1943. It is a tropical, marine eel which is known from seaward reefs in the Indo-Pacific regions.

Due to their similarities, Kaupichthys diodontus is sometimes considered synonymous with K. hyoproroides (more commonly known as the false moray), but some authors list them as distinct species.

References

Chlopsidae
Taxa named by Leonard Peter Schultz
Fish described in 1943